Arnarflug, also known as Eagle Air, was a major Icelandic airline that operated from April 1976 until its bankruptcy in October 1990. It was founded by former employees of Air Viking, following its own bankruptcy in March 1976. Arnarflug was the main competitor of Flugleiðir during the 1980s. The airline had both domestic and international flights as well as a car rental. The domestic part was made a separate company, Arnarflug innanlands hf., in May 1987. In 1991 it merged with Íslandsflug.

References

Airlines established in 1976
Airlines of Iceland
Defunct airlines of Iceland